Mill Creek is a stream in the San Juan National Forest in Archuleta County, Colorado, and a minor left tributary of San Juan River. It flows in a generally southwesterly direction from Mill Creek Canyon, east of Pagosa Springs between Coal Creek and Rio Blanco, to join the San Juan River just sound of Pagosa Springs.

See also
List of rivers of Colorado

References

Rivers of Archuleta County, Colorado